Transportation in the Sacramento metropolitan area consists of a variety of different modes of travel in El Dorado County, Placer County, Sacramento County, and Yolo County, which are the four counties that comprise the Sacramento metropolitan area.

Background 
Studies show that a vast majority of people in the area commute via personal automobile, with 76.9% driving alone and 9.5% carpooling, aided by carpool lanes which expedite their commute. A further 7.03% of workers in the region work from home, so the transportation modes of the remaining roughly 6.5% are rounded out by public transit, cycling, walking, motorcycle riding, and other means.

Roads and highways

Major freeways

Interstate 80 (I-80) 

Interstate 80 (I-80) is the east–west Interstate Highway that runs through the Sacramento metropolitan area. 

To the west, I-80 provides service to Fairfield, Oakland, and San Francisco. To the east, it provides service to Reno, Salt Lake City and beyond, terminating on the East Coast in Teaneck, New Jersey. 

Within the Sacramento region, I-80 follows more of a northeast–southwest direction than a true east–west direction, owing to both the local topography and the orientation of the nearby destination cities (Reno and San Francisco). 

It enters the region on the west from the Bay Area in Yolo County along the south side of UC Davis and after passing through the city of Davis, it crosses the Yolo Bypass (a major flood bypass for Sacramento) on the Yolo Causeway. Soon after touching down in West Sacramento, it splits northward away from the western terminus of the concurrent Highway 50 and Business Loop 80, thus bypassing Downtown Sacramento which the 50/Business 80 concurrency serves.

After the split, I-80 passes through the western side of West Sacramento, then continues on to cross over the American River, and passes through the middle of Natomas, where it has a full interchange with Interstate 5 (I-5). It then moves along the northern suburbs of Sacramento, North Sacramento and Del Paso Heights, before being joined by Business 80 at its eastern terminus in the southern part of North Highlands near the Sacramento McClellan Airport.

The route continues on towards Citrus Heights, Roseville (where it leaves Sacramento County and enters Placer County), and Rocklin, where it has an interchange with the southern end of California State Route 65 (SR 65). At this point, I-80 virtually exits the farthest suburban sprawl of Sacramento along the route, and rises in elevation as it passes through smaller mountainous and rural communities of the Sierra Nevada mountain range.

Interstate 5 (I-5) 

Interstate 5 (I-5) is the north–south interstate highway that runs through the Sacramento metropolitan area.

To the south, I-5 provides service to Stockton, Los Angeles, and San Diego, terminating at the Mexico–United States border. To the north, it provides service to Redding, Portland, and Seattle, terminating at the Canada–United States border.

The highway enters Sacramento County from the south near Thornton, then continues northward through the western edge of Elk Grove that is mostly uninhabited wetlands with the exception of Laguna West. As I-5 approaches the city limits of Sacramento near Freeport, it runs adjacent to the Sacramento River that is on the west. The river then makes an abrupt westward curve after which the highway is flanked by the south Sacramento neighborhoods of Pocket-Greenhaven on the west and Meadowview on the east. The river curves back and meets with I-5 again, closing up the Pocket area. The highway then continues along the west side of Land Park, passing by William Land Park and the Sacramento Zoo. As it reaches the southwest corner of the downtown grid, the highway has a full-service junction with the 50/Business 80 freeway, and also merges with California State Route 99 for a concurrency.

I-5 then goes along the western edge of Downtown Sacramento, passing by many prominent city landmarks such as the Crocker Art Museum, Tower Bridge, and Old Sacramento. After exiting Downtown, I-5 travels through the west side of the Railyards, and then crosses the American River. As it goes through Natomas, it crosses I-80 at the junction between the two freeways. Roughly three miles north, I-5 abruptly curves westward as California State Route 99 splits off and continues northward towards Yuba City and Marysville, ending the concurrency.

Following the split, the highway provides service to Sacramento International Airport (SMF), and as such, I-5 is the main route to access the airport for the entire Sacramento region. The highway then crosses the Sacramento River and routes across the Yolo Bypass via the Elkhorn Causeway. I-5 reaches Woodland, curves to the northwest direction, and then has a partial-service interchange with California State Route 113 at its northern terminus. After passing through Woodland, the highway converges with Interstate 505 near Dunnigan, then exits Yolo County, heading towards Redding and the Pacific Northwest.

U.S. Route 50 (US 50) 

U.S. Route 50 (US 50) is an east–west U.S. Highway through the Sacramento area that has its western terminus in West Sacramento, and provides service to South Lake Tahoe and ultimately Ocean City, Maryland, the highway's eastern terminus.

US 50 begins by branching off in West Sacramento from I-80, thus creating its western terminus. This portion of the highway is also concurrent with Interstate 80 Business, so they also share the western terminus. In the eastern part of West Sacramento, a short spur route peels away from US 50 in the form of California State Route 275 (SR 275), providing direct access to the Tower Bridge and Capitol Mall in Sacramento. After US 50 crosses over the Sacramento River, it meets Interstate 5 (I-5) at a full junction at the southwestern corner of Downtown Sacramento.

Following the I-5 junction, US 50 runs on a freeway section commonly referred to as the WX Freeway due to it being flanked by the parallel one-way W & X Streets, along the south side of Downtown Sacramento. This part of the freeway is also built upon a raised embankment, to allow the many city streets to pass under it. The route then hits an interchange with a crossing freeway where Business 80 is the route heading north, and SR 99 is the route heading south.

Following that interchange, US 50 goes between East Sacramento on the north and Oak Park in the south, providing convenient access to the UC Davis Medical Center in the northern part of Oak Park. It then routes along the southern tip of the California State University, Sacramento (CSUS or Sac State) campus with special ramps to get drivers directly between the campus and the freeway. It continues to eastern Sacramento suburbs including La Riviera, Rosemont, Rancho Cordova, and Folsom. This section of the highway east of Sac State is known to be a busy office corridor heavily concentrated with office parks, thus also causing traffic jams in both directions during rush hour.

As the highway exits Folsom, it also exits the farthest urban sprawl in that direction, climbs in elevation, and enters the more rural El Dorado County. It makes its way through many small municipalities, including Placerville and Pollock Pines and then reaches South Lake Tahoe.

California State Route 99 (SR 99) 

California State Route 99 (SR 99) is a north–south state highway in the Sacramento area. To the south, it serves the Central Valley cities of Stockton, Modesto, Fresno, and Bakersfield before terminating at the Wheeler Ridge Interchange to join I-5. To the north, SR 99 provides service to Yuba City and Chico, terminating in Red Bluff.

SR 99 reaches the Sacramento region from the south at Galt, a small town that is a distant exurb of Sacramento. It then routes along the west side of the rural farming communities Herald and Wilton before going through the core of Sacramento's suburban city on the south, Elk Grove. As it leaves Elk Grove, it passes by Cosumnes River College and a medical complex consisting of three major hospitals: Methodist Hospital of Sacramento, Sierra Vista Hospital, and the Kaiser Permanente South Sacramento Medical Center. The college and medical complex are both immediately to the west of SR 99; there are exits to Bruceville Rd. designed to give emergency vehicles easy and quick access to the hospitals. The highway then goes through the heart of South Sacramento, providing access to local points of importance such as the Florin Towne Centre and Little Saigon (Sacramento). North of South Sacramento, SR 99 is flanked by Curtis Park on the west and Oak Park on the east; Sacramento City College is accessible as it is roughly a half mile west of the freeway at this point, and the McGeorge School of Law in Oak Park is right next to the freeway as well.

At the junction with US 50 in the southeastern part of the central city, the thru lanes turn into the eastern section of Business 80. SR 99 does not continue straight, and instead connects to US 50 in the stretch west of the junction also known as the WX Freeway, in an unsigned concurrency (along with Business 80). At the interchange with I-5, SR 99 again does not pull through, and instead routes north onto the perpendicular I-5 for another unsigned concurrency.

SR 99 splits off from I-5 in North Natomas, with a slight northward jog, while I-5 makes a much sharper curve westward towards Sacramento International Airport and Woodland. SR 99 soon leaves Sacramento County, headed for Yuba City and Chico.

Business Loop 80 (Bus. 80) 

Business Loop 80 (Bus. 80), (also known as Business Route 80, Business 80, Capital City Freeway, "Cap City Freeway", and "Biz 80"), is a business loop of Interstate 80 (I-80) in Sacramento.

It has two segments, western and eastern. The western segment runs concurrently with US 50 from its western terminus in West Sacramento all the way to the US 50/SR 99/Bus. 80 interchange at the southeastern corner of the central city.

At the interchange, the western segment of Bus. 80 does not pull through, and instead becomes the eastern segment that branches north from the junction (via connector ramps). The eastern segment (albeit more in a north–south orientation) is flanked by a pair of one-way streets, 29th St. and 30th St., dividing Midtown Sacramento on the west and East Sacramento on the east. The Sutter medical complex in Midtown, consisting of Sutter Medical Center and Sutter General Hospital, is immediately to the west of the freeway, as is Sutter's Fort, a historic park. Bus. 80 then crosses over the American River into the Arden-Arcade area, providing access to Arden Fair Mall (a popular shopping mall) and Cal Expo (site of the annual California State Fair and other big local events throughout the year). Around this point, the freeway also converges with California State Route 160 (SR 160), a highway that provides direct travel to Downtown Sacramento from the Arden-Arcade area. After passing through Arden-Arcade, the freeway rejoins I-80, thus terminating.

Other highways

California State Route 113 (SR 113) 

California State Route 113 (SR 113) is a state highway that is primarily used as a north–south multi-lane freeway that carries traffic directly between I-80 near UC Davis and I-5 in Woodland.

From the south, SR 113 originates as a two-lane highway near Rio Vista, then travels through Dixon, after which it co-signs the portion of I-80 between Dixon and the connector ramp to its own freeway alignment near UC Davis. The freeway portion routes all the way to Woodland, where it briefly overlaps with I-5, then exiting and heading towards Knights Landing as a two-lane highway again.

California State Route 65 (SR 65) 

California State Route 65 (SR 65) is a state highway that runs between Roseville and Olivehurst.

Its southern terminus is at the junction with I-80 in the northeast part of Roseville. It begins as a freeway to Lincoln. After reaching Lincoln it becomes an expressway. It then passes Sheridan and Wheatland before terminating in Olivehurst, where it converges with California State Route 70 to continue on to Marysville.

California State Route 16 (SR 16) 

California State Route 16 (SR 16) is an east–west state highway that travels from SR 20 near Wilbur Springs to SR 49 between Plymouth and Drytown.

It enters the Sacramento metropolitan area at the west end through Yolo County. It takes a southeastward path through the small communities of Rumsey, Guinda, and Brooks. The route then turns eastward and passes through Esparto, California before crossing I-505. As it approaches Woodland, SR 16 turns 90 degrees to a northward direction at an intersection on the western edge of town. It then converges with I-5 towards Sacramento on an unsigned concurrency.

Combined with I-5, SR 16 travels past the Sacramento International Airport, across I-80, and through Downtown Sacramento along the Sacramento River before turning onto US 50 towards South Lake Tahoe at the junction.

The route pulls through the interchange with SR 99/Bus. 80, then exits US 50 at Howe Ave. just east of Sacramento State University. SR 16 is carried on the Howe Ave section that is south of US 50 for a very short distance before turning eastward onto Folsom Blvd. Less than a mile later, the route branches off from Folsom Blvd. on the south side as Jackson Rd., and it is also the beginning of the signed portion east of the concurrency. It continues for many miles through unincorporated communities in Sacramento County, including Sloughhouse and Rancho Murieta before exiting the county (and the metropolitan area) into Amador County, headed for Plymouth, Drytown, and Jackson.

The signed portion of the route is generally a two-lane highway in its entirety.

California State Route 84 (SR 84) 

California State Route 84 (SR 84) is a north–south state highway that runs between Rio Vista in Solano County and the Sacramento–San Joaquin River Delta, and West Sacramento in Yolo County.

It enters the Sacramento region on the south side through Yolo County near Courtland. The route turns eastward for a short distance, then turns north where it becomes Jefferson Blvd. SR 84 retains that name through West Sacramento, where it crosses and interchanges with US 50. Shortly afterwards, the route changes roads and turns westward at a 4-way intersection, becoming Sacramento Ave. and then Reed Ave. before terminating at its junction with I-80.

California State Route 160 (SR 160) 

California State Route 160 (SR 160) is a north–south state highway that runs between Antioch in the Sacramento–San Joaquin River Delta, and Arden-Arcade (a northeastern suburb of Sacramento).

The route begins at its southern terminus in eastern Antioch, where it is formed by a junction with California State Route 4. It then crosses the Antioch Bridge, leaving Antioch and entering the tip of Sacramento County's southwestern panhandle in Sherman Island. The route winds its way along the Sacramento River and through the delta, passing through small river towns such as Isleton, Walnut Grove, Courtland, and Clarksburg.

As SR 160 reaches the southern part of Sacramento near Cosumnes River Blvd., it continues straight, deviating from the Sacramento River that curves westward. At this point, the route is now referred to as Freeport Blvd. and it also becomes a four-lane expressway. It passes through the Meadowview neighborhood and then forms the western boundary of the Sacramento Executive Airport as it goes through South Land Park. As it proceeds through the central part of Land Park, it divides Sacramento City College on the east and William Land Park on the west. Right before reaching the railroad tracks near 4th Avenue/Wayne Hultgren station, SR 160 turns northwest at its fork with 21st St., still continuing as Freeport Blvd.

The route joins Broadway and heads westward, then turning north onto the 15th St./16th St. one-way pair into the downtown grid; 15th St. is southbound and 16th St. is northbound. In the northern part of downtown, 15th St. actually dead ends, so the southbound part of the highway turns away from 15th St. at H St, a one-way eastbound street, for three city blocks, and north of H St. the southbound portion of the highway is carried on 12th St.

12th St. curves in the northern part of Downtown to be next to 16th St. and becomes a freeway. Then the highway turns northeastward, crosses the American River, and then turns eastward. The route terminates where it converges with Bus. 80 in Arden-Arcade.

Spur routes

California State Route 275 (SR 275) 

California State Route 275 (SR 275) is a short spur route that peels off from US 50 in West Sacramento and provides direct access to Downtown Sacramento. After exiting US 50, the route runs along the north side of Raley Field, crosses the Tower Bridge, becomes Capitol Mall after touching down in Sacramento, and terminates at the front yard of the California State Capitol at 10th Street.

Rail

Amtrak

The primary transit agency in the Sacramento metropolitan area for inter-city rail service is Amtrak. Amtrak serves the region with six stations and four routes. Locals can travel north, south, east, or west by rail using Amtrak to get to destinations all around California and beyond.

Stations 

 Auburn station
 Colfax station
 Davis station
 Rocklin station
 Roseville station
 Sacramento Valley Station

Routes 

 California Zephyr (Chicago <—> Emeryville) - serves Colfax, Roseville, Sacramento, and Davis
 Capitol Corridor (Auburn <—> San Jose) - serves Auburn, Rocklin, Roseville, Sacramento, and Davis
 Coast Starlight (Seattle <—> Los Angeles) - serves Sacramento and Davis
 San Joaquin (Bakersfield <—> Sacramento) - serves Sacramento

Sacramento RT Light Rail

Overview 
The Sacramento Regional Transit District provides light rail service in Sacramento and the surrounding communities. This Sacramento RT Light Rail system has three lines and 54 stations. All the lines terminate in or travel through Downtown Sacramento, the central business district of Sacramento, and the main employment center for the metropolitan area. For commuters to downtown, light rail is a popular alternative to driving for various reasons. All light rail stations with a park-and-ride lot offer free parking (except for Cosumnes River College station, where the college operates and maintains the station), whereas formerly, many of the stations charged a fee for parking. Annual ridership on the system is about 14 million.

Lines 

 Blue Line - north–south route that runs between Cosumnes River College and Watt/I-80. Also serves South Sacramento, Sacramento City College, Downtown Sacramento, North Sacramento, and North Highlands. Part of the line at the northern end is in the median of Interstate 80.

 Gold Line - east–west route that runs between Sacramento Valley Station and either Sunrise or Historic Folsom. Also serves Downtown Sacramento, Midtown Sacramento, East Sacramento, Sacramento State University, Rancho Cordova, and Gold River. For most of its length, the rail runs alongside US 50 and Folsom Blvd.

Green Line - a short route that runs between 13th Street and 7th & Richards/Township 9. Compared to the other two lines, the Green Line has less operating hours and longer headways; it also has no weekend service. It is slated for future expansion to Natomas and the Sacramento International Airport.

Stations

Schedule 
For the Blue and Gold Lines, the trains operate from 4:30 a.m. to 12:30 a.m. Monday through Saturday, and 5 a.m. to 11 a.m. on Sunday. Headways are 15 minutes Monday through Friday until the evening, and 30 minutes during nights and weekends.

For the Green Line, trains operate from 6 a.m. to 8:30 p.m. Monday through Friday with 30-minute headways at all times. There is no weekend service.

Freight  
Most of the rail freight transport in the Sacramento is by Union Pacific Railroad. On one particular route in Midtown Sacramento, 5-10 trains pass through per day. Today, Sacramento serves as a major junction between east–west and north–south railroad lines - from San Francisco to Chicago, and from San Diego to Seattle.

Bus

Intercity bus services

Greyhound  
Greyhound offers bus rides to destinations all over the country from two locations in the Sacramento area:

 Sacramento Bus Station - 420 Richards Blvd., Sacramento, CA 95811
 Roseville Bus Stop - 201 Pacific St., Roseville, CA 95678

Megabus 
Megabus is an intercity bus service that offers trips between the University/65th Street station in Sacramento and the 4th and King Street station in San Francisco. The service makes up to five trips per day.

RT Bus 

The Sacramento Regional Transit District offers local bus service throughout the City of Sacramento and some surrounding areas from 5 a.m. until 11 p.m. daily. The bus system consists of 70 routes and over 3,100 total bus stops. Ever since the light rail opened, the buses have primarily acted as feeders to the light rail routes. Headways are between 15 minutes and 80 minutes. Some routes operate on weekdays only or peak hours only.

Other local bus agencies 

 E-tran is the local bus agency for the city of Elk Grove. It offers local routes, commuter routes to and from Downtown Sacramento (including one reverse commuter route), and a commuter route to the Butterfield station and the Franchise Tax Board.

 Yolobus is the local bus agency for Yolo County providing service all throughout the county, but primarily to the three main cities of West Sacramento, Davis, and Woodland. It also has routes extending to Downtown Sacramento, the Sacramento International Airport, and Vacaville. Yolobus is the only public transit agency that currently offers regularly scheduled service to the airport.

Unitrans is the bus transit system that operates in and around UC Davis, ferrying students and faculty between the campus and various locations around Davis. The system is run by the university's students.

Roseville Transit is the transit system serving the northeastern Sacramento suburb of Roseville. It has fourteen local routes, and eight trips per day on the weekdays servicing Downtown Sacramento for commuters.
Placer County Transit serves the suburbanized western portion of Placer County besides Roseville. Routes provide service to Alta, Auburn, Colfax, Lincoln, Rocklin, and Sierra College. From Auburn, Placer County Transit also has bus routes to the Watt/I-80 station and commuter buses to Downtown Sacramento.

El Dorado Transit is the transit agency serving El Dorado County, including the towns of Cameron Park, Diamond Springs, Placerville, and Pollock Pines. In addition to serving locales within El Dorado County, the bus system also has eleven daily commuter routes to Downtown Sacramento, two reverse commuter routes from Downtown Sacramento, and service to the Iron Point station and Folsom Lake College.

Commuter buses from outside the region 
The following bus agencies are all based outside of the Sacramento metropolitan area, but provide regularly scheduled commuter bus routes to and from Downtown Sacramento on the weekdays.

 Fairfield and Suisun Transit/Vacaville City Coach/Solano Express - from Fairfield, Vacaville, Dixon
Yuba-Sutter Transit - from Yuba City, Marysville, Olivehurst, Plumas Lake
Amador Transit - from Sutter Creek/Sutter Hill/Jackson, Drytown, Rancho Murieta
San Joaquin Regional Transit District - from Stockton, Lodi

Air

Sacramento International Airport (SMF) 

Sacramento International Airport (SMF) is the commercial airport serving the region.

Overview 
The airport is located 10 miles northwest of Downtown Sacramento. It is run by the Sacramento County Airport system. Southwest Airlines accounts for about half of the airport's passengers. Through SMF, passengers can fly directly to many major cities across the contiguous United States as well as Mexico, Vancouver, and Hawaii. To fly directly to transcontinental destinations (particularly in Asia), many locals instead opt to fly from the much busier San Francisco International Airport.

Runways 
SMF has two parallel north–south runways owing to the prevailing wind patterns of the region. The two runways are 16L/34R (8,605 ft. concrete) and 16R/34L (8,598 ft. asphalt).

Terminals 
There are two terminals at SMF, Terminal A and Terminal B:

 Terminal A - 13 gates; hosts Air Canada, American, Delta, and United
 Terminal B - 19 gates; hosts Aeroméxico, Alaska, Frontier, Hawaiian, JetBlue, Southwest Airlines, and Volaris

Other airports 
There are many other smaller airports in the Sacramento metropolitan area which serve purposes such as general aviation, air taxi, air charter, air cargo, and military aviation. The list of those airports is as follows:

 Auburn Municipal Airport
 Blue Canyon–Nyack Airport
 Borges–Clarksburg Airport
 Cameron Airpark
 Elk Grove Airport
 Franklin Field
 Georgetown Airport
 Lake Tahoe Airport
 Lincoln Regional Airport
 Placerville Airport
 Rancho Murieta Airport
 Sacramento Executive Airport
 Sacramento Mather Airport
 Sacramento McClellan Airport
 Swansboro Country Airport
 Truckee Tahoe Airport
 University Airport
 Yolo County Airport

Marine 
Some of Sacramento's freight shipping and trading is done to and from the Port of Sacramento in West Sacramento, and through the Sacramento Deep Water Ship Channel. 

The Sacramento Deep Water Ship Channel was a manmade canal created to exchange goods with the Port of Oakland. Most of the items shipped are agricultural products and bulk goods, not container shipments.

Cycling 
In Sacramento, cycling is a common means of transportation, especially in the central city (Downtown and Midtown), where residents and visitors find it to be safe, cheap, and efficient. Many of the city streets in the urban core have 3 ft. wide designated bike lanes, some are painted bright green, and some are placed between the sidewalk and the parked cars (providing a physical barrier from moving motor vehicle traffic).

There are also a variety of bike trails and bike paths in Sacramento, most notably the Jedediah Smith Memorial Trail that runs along the American River, a 32-mile trail closed to motor vehicles.

In Davis, a college town for UC Davis, cycling is incredibly popular. Here, some 23.2% of commuters commute by bicycle, the highest in the nation. This is more than the double the city with the next-highest percentage of bicycle commuters (Berkeley, California, another college town, with 9.7%).

Jump Bikes offers its bicycle-sharing service in both Sacramento and Davis.

Notable bridges 
The following notable bridges either sit entirely in the Sacramento metropolitan area, or enter and exit the Sacramento metropolitan area:

Transportation museums 
The following notable transportation museums are located in the Sacramento Metropolitan Area:
Aerospace Museum of California - North Highlands
California Automobile Museum - Sacramento
California State Railroad Museum - Sacramento
Reiff's Antique Gas Station Automotive Museum - Woodland
Tahoe Maritime Museum - Lake Tahoe
United States Bicycling Hall of Fame - Davis

See also 

 Sacramento metropolitan area
 Transportation in California
 Transportation in the San Francisco Bay Area

References 

 
Sacramento metropolitan area
Transportation in Sacramento, California